Guangxicyon is an extinct genus of amphicyonid carnivoran, or "bear dog," which inhabited Central Asia during the Late Eocene subepoch, 37—33 Ma, existing for approximately .

Guangxicyon was named by Zhai et al. in 2003. Its type and only known species is Guangxicyon sinoamericanus.

Fossil distribution
One site in Southern China.

Sources

Eocene mammals of Asia
Bear dogs
Eocene carnivorans
Prehistoric animals of China
Prehistoric carnivoran genera